Giorgio Gaslini (22 October 1929 – 29 July 2014) was an Italian jazz pianist, composer and conductor.

He began performing aged 13 and recorded with his jazz trio at 16. In the 1950s and 1960s, Gaslini performed with his own quartet. He was the first Italian musician mentioned as a "new talent" in the Down Beat poll and the first Italian officially invited to a jazz festival in the USA (New Orleans 1976–77). He collaborated with leading American soloists, such as Anthony Braxton, Steve Lacy, Don Cherry, Roswell Rudd, Max Roach, but also with the Argentinian Gato Barbieri and Frenchman Jean-Luc Ponty. He also adapted the compositions of Albert Ayler and Sun Ra for solo piano, which the Soul Note label issued. He also composed the soundtrack of Michelangelo Antonioni's La notte (The Night, 1961).

From 1991 to 1995, Gaslini composed works for Carlo Actis Dato's Italian Instabile Orchestra, and was the first holder of jazz courses at the Santa Cecilia Academy of Music in Rome (1972–73). As to contemporary music, he composed symphonic works, operas and ballets represented at the Scala Theatre in Milan and other Italian theatres, in addition to film scores, including Bali (1970), Your Hands on My Body (1970), Cross Current (1971), The Hassled Hooker (1972), The Night of the Devils (1972), So Sweet, So Dead (1972), When Women Were Called Virgins (1972), Five Women for the Killer (1974) and Kleinhoff Hotel (1977). In 1975 he was contacted by Dario Argento to score Deep Red, having previously scored Argento's The Five Days in 1973. Argento was disappointed by the music, and only three of Gaslini's original themes were retained.

Gaslini died at 84 in Borgo Val di Taro, in the province of Parma, where he had been living for years together with his longtime wife and 14 dogs and cats.

Discography

As leader

Compilations
L'Integrale, Anthologia Cronologica No. 1, No. 2 (Soul Note, 1948–1964)
L'Integrale, Anthologia Cronologica No. 3, No. 4 (Soul Note, 1964–1968)
L'Integrale, Anthologia Cronologica No. 5, No. 6 (Soul Note, 1968–1969)
L'Integrale, Anthologia Cronologica No. 7, No. 8 (Soul Note, 1973–1974)

Main sources:

Selected filmography 
 La notte (1961)
 Le sorelle (1969)
 Le tue mani sul mio corpo (1970)
 La pacifista (1970)
 Incontro d'amore a Bali (1970)
 Un omicidio perfetto a termine di legge (1971)
 Quando le donne si chiamavano madonne (1972)
 Il vero e il falso (film)|Il vero e il falso (1972)
 La notte dei diavoli (1972)
 Rivelazioni di un maniaco sessuale al capo della squadra mobile (1972)
 Le cinque giornate (1973)
 Profondo rosso (1975) (with Goblin)

References

External links

1929 births
2014 deaths
Academic staff of the Accademia Nazionale di Santa Cecilia
Italian film score composers
Italian male film score composers
Italian jazz pianists
Italian male pianists
Italian conductors (music)
Italian male conductors (music)
Italian bandleaders
Nastro d'Argento winners
Musicians from Milan
20th-century pianists
20th-century Italian musicians
20th-century Italian male musicians
Male jazz musicians
Italian Instabile Orchestra members